Gila Crossing (O'odham: Kuiwa) is a census-designated place (CDP) in Maricopa County, Arizona, United States, within the Gila River Indian Community south of Komatke. The population was 636 at the 2020 census.

Geography 
The community is on the southern side of the Phoenix metropolitan area, in the valley of the Gila River.

Demographics 

As of the census of 2010, there were 621 people living in the CDP. The population density was 714.5 people per square mile. The racial makeup of the CDP was 84% Native American, 3% White, 1% Black or African American, 1% from other races, and 11% from two or more races. 15% of the population were Hispanic or Latino of any race.

Transportation
Gila River Transit connects Gila Crossing with Komatke and Maricopa Colony.

References

External links
 

Census-designated places in Maricopa County, Arizona
Gila River Indian Community
Native American history of Arizona